This is a list of Dutch television related events from 2012.

Events
20 January - Iris Kroes wins the second series of The Voice of Holland.
26 February - Joan Franka is selected to represent Netherlands at the 2012 Eurovision Song Contest with her song "You and Me". She is selected to be the fifty-third Dutch Eurovision entry during Nationaal Songfestival held at Studio 24 in Hilversum.
23 March - 13-year-old Fabiënne Bergmans wins the first series of The Voice Kids.
1 June - Jump rope team DDF Crew win the fifth series of Holland's Got Talent.
13 October - Goede tijden, slechte tijden actor Mark van Eeuwen and his partner Jessica Maybury win the first series of Strictly Come Dancing.
14 December - Leona Philippo wins the third series of The Voice of Holland.

Debuts

Television shows

1950s
NOS Journaal (1956–present)

1970s
Sesamstraat (1976–present)

1980s
Jeugdjournaal (1981–present)
Het Klokhuis (1988–present)

1990s
Goede tijden, slechte tijden (1990–present)

2000s
X Factor (2006–present)
Holland's Got Talent (2008–present)

2010s
The Voice of Holland (2010–present)

Ending this year

Births

Deaths

See also
2012 in the Netherlands